Rogers Brook (also known as Roger's Creek) is a tributary of the Lackawanna River in Wayne County, Pennsylvania, in the United States. The stream has one unnamed tributary. The watershed of Rogers Brook drains part of the Moosic Mountains Ridge. The surficial geology in the stream's vicinity mainly consists of Wisconsinan Till, surface mining land, and bedrock containing sandstone and shale.

Course
Rogers Brook begins on a low hill in Clinton Township. It flows west for several hundred feet before turning west-northwest. After a few tenths of a mile, the stream turns north-northwest for a short distance. It then turns northwest for several tenths of a mile, receiving an unnamed tributary from the right before turning west-southwest for several tenths of a mile and flowing through a small valley to its confluence with the Lackawanna River, not far from the border between Wayne County and Lackawanna County.

Tributaries
Rogers Brook has no named tributaries.

Geography and geology

The surficial geology in the vicinity of Rogers Brook mostly consists of a glacial or resedimented till known as Wisconsinan Till. However, near the stream's mouth, there is a patch of surface mining land, consisting of linear pits and piles of waste rock. There is a smaller patch of such land further upstream as well. Additionally, the surficial geology near the stream includes some patches of bedrock consisting of sandstone and shale.

Rogers Brook drains a portion of the western side of the Moosic Mountain Ridge.

Watershed
Rogers Brook is entirely within the United States Geological Survey quadrangle of Forest City. The confluence of Rogers Brook with the Lackawanna River is located to the south of Browndale.

Rogers Brook is a second-order stream.

Rogers Brook drains a tract of land in or near the Panther Bluff Preserve and to the north of Salko's tract. The Panther Bluff Preserve is a conserved area of undeveloped land high in the Moosic Mountains.

History
Rogers Brook was entered into the Geographic Names Information System on January 1, 1990. Its identifier in the Geographic Names Information System is 1202343. The stream is also known as Roger's Creek.

See also
Wilson Creek (Lackawanna River), next tributary of the Lackawanna River going downriver
Clarks Creek (Lackawanna River), next tributary of the Lackawanna River going upriver
List of rivers of Pennsylvania
List of tributaries of the Lackawanna River

References

Rivers of Wayne County, Pennsylvania
Tributaries of the Lackawanna River
Rivers of Pennsylvania